Michael Schiele (born 3 March 1978) is a German former footballer and manager who manages Eintracht Braunschweig.

Managerial statistics

References

External links

1978 births
Living people
German footballers
German football managers
VfR Aalen players
1. FC Schweinfurt 05 players
SV Sandhausen players
2. Bundesliga players
3. Liga players
Regionalliga players
2. Bundesliga managers
3. Liga managers
Würzburger Kickers managers
SV Sandhausen managers
Eintracht Braunschweig managers
People from Heidenheim
Sportspeople from Stuttgart (region)
Footballers from Baden-Württemberg
Association football midfielders